John Parascandola (born July 14, 1941) is an American medical historian.  He has written numerous books, including The Development of American Pharmacology: John J. Abel and the Shaping of a Discipline, and held the position of Public Health Service Historian.

Education
Parascandola received his Bachelor's Degree in Chemistry from Brooklyn College before receiving his Master's Degree in Biochemistry and his PhD in the History of Science in 1968 at the University of Wisconsin - Madison.  Parascandola did post-doctoral work at Harvard University.

Career
Parascandola's career began in 1974 as Director of the American Institute of the History of Pharmacy, where he remained until 1981.  In 1983, Parascandola became Chief of the History of Medicine Division of the United States National Library of Medicine.  In 1992, he became Public Health Service Historian, which he held until his retirement in 2004.    He has taught at the University of Wisconsin–Madison and currently teaches at the University of Maryland.

Writings
Parascandola's two most recognized books are The Development of American Pharmacology: John J. Abel and the Shaping of a Discipline, which was written in 1992 and received the 1994 George Urdang Medal,  and Sex, Sin, and Science: A History of Syphilis in America, which was released in 2008 and won the George Pendleton Prize for 2009.

Awards
Parascandola has been the recipient of several awards, including the Surgeon General’s Exemplary Service Award, the Assistant Secretary for Health’s Superior Service Award, the National Institute of Health Merit Award, and the Surgeon General's Medallion. In 2002, he received the Sidney M. Edelstein Award for Outstanding Achievement in the History of Chemistry from the American Chemical Society.

References

External links
 Parascandola's personal web page

People from Rockville, Maryland
21st-century American historians
21st-century American male writers
Brooklyn College alumni
University of Wisconsin–Madison alumni
Harvard University alumni
University of Wisconsin–Madison faculty
1941 births
Living people
21st-century American chemists
Historians from Maryland
American male non-fiction writers